Russell Smith (July 13, 1822 – May 10, 1866) was an American politician.

Smith was born on July 13, 1822. He entered Yale College from Norfolk, Virginia and graduated in 1842. He studied in the Yale Law School, and was admitted to the bar in Sept., 1843. In the spring of 1844 he entered upon the practice of law in N. Y. City, and continued in it until 1852, when he removed to Yonkers, N. Y. He afterward devoted himself only occasionally to his profession. In 1852 he was elected to the Legislature of N. Y.

He was married, Sept. 10, 1844, to Miss Harriette M. Bacon, of New Haven.  He left  a daughter.  He died in New York City, May 10, 1866, aged 43 years.

External links

1822 births
1866 deaths
Politicians from Norfolk, Virginia
Yale Law School alumni
Members of the New York State Assembly
New York (state) lawyers
19th-century American politicians
Yale College alumni
19th-century American lawyers